Kenan Yücel (born 1974 in Bursa, Turkey), Turkish poet and writer.

He spent his childhood and early youth in Bursa, and graduated from Marmara University, The Faculty of Law (2001). He lives in İstanbul.

His poetry first met with its readers at "Başka" poetry review (1997). In various poetry magazines, his poems, critiques and writings on poetry are published. Critics expressed him as one of the poets of 2000s whose poetry has its problematic, and from his own individual life he works out social issues.

He is editor-inchief of "Ve" publishing house.

Bibliography

Poetry
 Uzaklara Atılmış Bir Kedi Hüznü, Yitik Ülke Press, 2007, 
 Örselenmiş Ruhlar Bandosu, Şiirden Press, 2009, 
 Sabahsız Bir Gecenin Uykusuzu, Şiirden Press, 2011,

External links
 Official web site
 "Ve" Publishing House
 Şiirden Press
 Poems of Kenan Yücel

References
 Bibliography
 "Örselenmiş Ruhlar Bandosu" (Kadir Aydemir)
 Mahsus Mahal magazine
 "Uzun Ağıtların Üvey Doğusu" (Mazlum Çetinkaya)
 "Uzaklara Atılmış bir Kedi Hüznü" (Şehmus Ay)
 Eliz magazine, 2009 (Ahmet Ada)
 Akatalpa magazine, May 2009 (Ramis Dara)
 A poem in his handwriting

1974 births
People from Bursa
Turkish poets
Turkish writers
Living people